Cirrhilabrus finifenmaa, also known by its common name rose-veiled fairy wrasse, is a rainbow-colored wrasse that is native to the reefs of the Maldives.

Discovery and etymology
C. finifenmaa was spotted by John Ernest Randall in the 1990s and was initially thought to be an adult version of C. rubrisquamis, a fish from the Chagos Archipelago island chain. The researchers who described C. finifenmaa suggested that C. rubrisquamis may be synonymous with C. wakanda.

C. finifenmaa was first described as a separate species in 2022 by a team of researchers from the University of Sydney, the Maldives Marine Research Institute (MMRI), the Field Museum, and the California Academy of Sciences as part of the Hope for Reefs project. Ahmed Najeeb, a biologist at the MMRI, co-authored the paper announcing the discovery, making him the first Maldivian to describe a new species. The species is named after the Dhivehi word , meaning rose, due to its coloration.

Description
They live between 131 and 229 feet below the surface. It has vivid red-orange color on its face and its tail is yellow and violet, they change their colors as they become adults.

Cirrhilabrus finifenmaa have a lateral line that contain 22–26 pored scales.

References 

Fauna of the Maldives
Fish described in 2022
finifenmaa
Taxa named by Luiz A. Rocha